Alex B. Fink is a United States Army major general currently serving as chief, United States Army Enterprise Marketing team.

Early life and education
Fink was raised in Oregon, Missouri. He attended the University of Missouri and participated in its ROTC program. He was commissioned as a second lieutenant in 1990.

Fink later earned a Master of Business Administration from the University of Illinois and a Master of Strategic Studies from the United States Army War College.

Military career
In 1994, Fink transitioned to the Illinois Army National Guard, where he served as a battalion fire support officer and operations officer for the 2nd Battalion, 122nd Field Artillery in Chicago, Illinois.

From 2014 to 2016, Fink served as the commander for the 649th Regional Support Group in Cedar Rapids, Iowa. He was then appointed as commander of the United States Army Reserve 4th Sustainment Command (Expeditionary) until August 2019.

In 2019, Fink joined active duty officers to explore using big data to improve Army marketing and recruitment initiatives.

Civilian career
As a civilian, Fink worked as a senior business strategy consultant and project manager for The Context Network.

Personal life
Fink is married to Janet, and has three children.

References

Gies College of Business alumni
Living people
Recipients of the Legion of Merit
United States Army generals
United States Army personnel of the Iraq War
United States Army personnel of the War in Afghanistan (2001–2021)
University of Missouri alumni
Year of birth missing (living people)